Harmony Garden is a Home Ownership Scheme and Private Sector Participation Scheme court built on the reclaimed land in Siu Sai Wan, Hong Kong Island, Hong Kong near Siu Sai Wan Sports Ground, Siu Sai Wan Swimming Pool and Island Resort. It was jointly developed by the Hong Kong Housing Authority and Chevalier Group and has a total of eight residential blocks built in 1997.

Houses

Demographics
According to the 2016 by-census, Harmony Garden had a population of 7,037. The median age was 46.6 and the majority of residents (95.8 per cent) were of Chinese ethnicity. The average household size was 3.2 people. The median monthly household income of all households (i.e. including both economically active and inactive households) was HK$38,800.

Politics
Harmony Garden is located in Yan Lam constituency of the Eastern District Council. It was formerly represented by Alice Ishigami Lee Fung-king, who was elected in the 2019 elections until July 2021.

Education
Harmony Garden is in Primary One Admission (POA) School Net 16. Within the school net are multiple aided schools (operated independently but funded with government money) and two government schools: Shau Kei Wan Government Primary School and Aldrich Bay Government Primary School.

See also

Public housing estates in Chai Wan and Siu Sai Wan

References

Home Ownership Scheme
Private Sector Participation Scheme
Siu Sai Wan
Residential buildings completed in 1997